The Western Idaho Fair is the one of the annual state fairs of Idaho. It has been held in the capital city of Boise virtually every late summer/early fall since 1897, and annually in the city of Garden City on the grounds of the Expo Idaho since 1967. It is usually held from the third Friday of August, until the fourth Sunday of August.  

The corresponding Eastern Idaho Fair is held in Bingham County at Blackfoot.

History
Western Idaho Fair's historical precursor was the Idaho Intermountain Fair, first held in 1897.  As with many fairs of its era it was primarily an agricultural and livestock exhibition; sheep, cattle, horses and hogs were shipped to Boise from all over the West for the event.
In the spring of 1902, the fair association purchased  of land on the present-day corner of Fairview and Orchard and moved the fair to that site. This was also the year that the fair welcomed "Buffalo Bill" Cody's Wild West Show. The fair of 1913 included its first full-fledged rodeo, called the Boise Stampede. This rodeo included the best livestock and contestants from other famous rodeos, such as the Pendleton Round-Up and Cheyenne Frontier Days.

The fair's continuity suffered during the next two decades due to economic issues, war, changes in management, and a simple lack of interest. From 1913 to 1935 (except 1917–18, when it went on hiatus caused by World War I), for example, the fair changed names five times, and wasn't even held in eight of those twenty-two years. In 1936, Ada County Commissioners appointed a Fair Board to organize a new Western Idaho State Fair. Ed Sproat was named fair manager at that time and after a successful 1936 fair a gift of $1,000 was given to him for a "job well done." This was the first time any money had been given to the fair volunteers. After 1941, World War II forced the cancellation of the fair for the next four years.

In 1967, the growing fair was moved to its current location at the corner of Chinden Boulevard and Glenwood Avenue in Garden City on the grounds of Expo Idaho, and its named changed to the Western Idaho Fair.  Bob Lorimer, Idaho Statesman reporter and agricultural columnist for many years, wrote, "Even the name is new – and so is everything else except familiar faces and tradition." The 2020 Western Idaho Fair was cancelled due to the COVID-19 pandemic, but in a return to its roots 4-H and Future Farmers of America youth exhibits, competitions and sales will still be held.

Events

Throughout the years Western Idaho Fair has showcased Idaho crops, livestock, arts, and culture.  The fair hosts a variety of judging competitions, and popular entertainment typical of the state fair of an agricultural state.  

The list of notables who have visited the Western Idaho Fair, either as guests or as entertainers, includes Charles Lindbergh in 1927, Slim Pickens in 1946, William Shatner in 1968, The Doobie Brothers and Ronald Reagan in 1976, Paul Revere and the Raiders in 1971 and 1975, The Charlie Daniels Band in 1984 and 1988, Muhammad Ali in 1985 and 1986, Reba McEntire and Conway Twitty in 1986, and Johnny Cash in 1990, REO Speedwagon in 1997 and 2007, Ted Nugent in 2002, Foreigner in 2009 and in 2013, "Weird Al" Yankovic and Styx in 2012, and many others. 

The late J. R. Simplot, world-renowned for creating a process to freeze potatoes and thus supplying McDonald's with its famous French fries, was a fan of the draft horse and mule show and rarely missed a fair in his 99 years.

References

External links

 http://www.idahofair.com/
 http://www.expoidaho.com/

Culture of Boise, Idaho
Festivals in Idaho
Idaho
Tourist attractions in Boise, Idaho
Festivals established in 1897